Karl Decker (5 September 1921 – 27 September 2005) was an Austrian footballer and manager. He is usually regarded as one of Austria's greatest players and one of the most prolific players of his generation.

International career
As a player Decker played for both Germany and Austria national football team, scoring 27 goals in 33 matches. He was also part of Austria's squad for the football tournament at the 1948 Summer Olympics, but he did not play in any matches.

Honours
Austrian Football Bundesliga (3):
 1942, 1943, 1944
Austrian Cup (1):
 1943
Austrian Bundesliga Top Goalscorer (2):
 1944, 1950

References

External links
 

1921 births
2005 deaths
Footballers from Vienna
Austrian footballers
Austria international footballers
German footballers
Germany international footballers
First Vienna FC players
SK Sturm Graz players
FC Sochaux-Montbéliard players
Austrian Football Bundesliga players
Ligue 1 players
Austrian expatriate footballers
Expatriate footballers in Switzerland
Expatriate footballers in France
Austrian expatriate sportspeople in France
Austrian expatriate sportspeople in Switzerland
Olympic footballers of Austria
Footballers at the 1948 Summer Olympics
Austrian football managers
First Vienna FC managers
Austria national football team managers
SK Sturm Graz managers
SK Rapid Wien managers
Wiener Sport-Club managers
Dual internationalists (football)
Association football midfielders
Austrian expatriate football managers
Expatriate football managers in Switzerland